The Potez 6D is a French six cylinder inverted inline aircraft engine put into production after World War II in normal and supercharged versions.

Design and development
In the 1930s Potez planned a series of new engines to replace their Anzani-derived radial engines. The Potez 4D, a four-cylinder inverted inline engine ran before World War II but did not reach production until the late 1940s, when it was joined by another inverted inline, the six cylinder 6D, and an eight-cylinder inverted-V, the Potez 8D. The D-series engines had much in common, most obviously sharing pistons and cylinders, with the same stroke, bore and valve gear. The inlines also shared connecting rods and lubrication systems and were offered in normally aspirated or supercharged versions.

Variants
Data from Jane's All the World's aircraft 1956-57 pp. 430–1.
6D-00
6D-02 Similar to 6D-30A without supercharger and 2x Hobson A1.55/j downdraught carburettors -  at 2,530 rpm
6D-30B Supercharger drive ratio 15.5:1,  for take-off at 2,400 rpm.

Applications
Morane-Saulnier Alcyon - over 200 built
Nord Noralpha
Nord Norécrin

Survivors
 Several Alcyons still fly in France. In 2014 there were 34 on the French civil register.

Specifications (Potez 6D-02)

See also

References

6D
1940s aircraft piston engines